The  is a private art museum, located in the Nakata neighborhood of the city of Mishima, Shizuoka Prefecture, central Japan. The museum was founded in 1966 by Mishima-born Sano Ryūichi, founder of the chemical company Tekkōsha and recipient of the Second Order of the Sacred Treasure. The museum has a collection of over 2500 items, and is especially noted for its collection of Japanese swords.

Cultural properties

National Treasures
The highlight of the Sano Art Museum collection is a naginata halberd from the 14th century Kamakura period. It is designated as a National Treasure

Important cultural properties
The museum owns various Japanese artworks most notably a number of excellent Japanese swords, some of which have been designated as Important Cultural Property. Other items in the collection include sculptures (one Important Cultural Property), Noh masks, textiles and accessories, ceramics, Japanese dolls, items of calligraphy and paintings.

References

Museums in Shizuoka Prefecture
Art museums and galleries in Japan
Art museums established in 1966
1966 establishments in Japan
Mishima, Shizuoka